The Battle of Vijayawada was fought in 1068 between the Chola army under Virarajendra Chola and the Western Chalukya army commanded by Vikramaditya VI near the present-day city of Vijayawada in Andhra Pradesh, India. The war resulted in the recovery of Vengi by the Cholas.

Causes 

In 1066, during the reign of the Western Chalukya king Someshvara I, Vikramaditya VI had invaded the Chola Empire penetrating as far as the capital Gangaikonda Cholapuram and threatening the city before being repulsed.  The Chola Emperor Virarajendra Chola reacted by leading a huge force into the Western Chalukya kingdom. Virarajendra proposed a showdown at Kudal-Sangamam at the junction of the Krishna and the Tungabhadra, but when Someshvara I failed to turn up, Virarajendra ravaged the country and defeated the Nolamba, Kadava and Vaidumba feudatories of Someshvara I and besieged the city of Vengi which the Cholas had earlier lost to the Western Chalukyas.

Events 

The Western Chalukya garrison led by Jananatha and Rajamayan fought a decisive battle with the Cholas but facing the prospect of imminent defeat, fled into the jungles of the north with the Chola army in hot pursuit. Virarajendra pursued the fleeing Western Chalukya forces beyond the Godavari River. After conquering Kalinga and Sakkarakkottam, Virarajendra crowned Vijayaditya VII as the king of Vengi and returned home.

References

Bibliography 
 

11th century in India
History of Andhra Pradesh
Vijayawada
1068 in Asia
Western Chalukya Empire
Vijayawada
Vijayawada
Vijayawada